C. articulatus can refer to a few different species.  The specific epithet  means 'jointed' or 'articulated.'

 Celastrus articulatus, synonym for Celastrus orbiculatus, oriental bittersweet
 Chiton articulatus, a type of chiton in the genus Chiton
 Conus articulatus, synonym for Conasprella articulata, the nada cone
 Crotalocephalus articulatus, a species of Crotalocephalus trilobite
 Cyperus articulatus, jointed flatsedge or priprioca